Cherbourg-Octeville is a former commune in the Manche department in Normandy in north-western France. It was formed when Cherbourg and Octeville merged on 28 February 2000. On 1 January 2016, it was merged into the new commune of Cherbourg-en-Cotentin, of which it became a delegated commune. Its population was 35,338 in 2019.

Cherbourg-Octeville is represented by a delegate mayor (Sébastien Fagnen, elected in 2017) and a delegate municipal council.

Population

See also
Communes of the Manche department

References and notes

 
Cherbourgocteville